Satyajit Boolell, also known as Ajit Boolell, is a Mauritian lawyer who is the current Director of Public Prosecutions (Mauritius). Under the Asset Recovery Act he is considered as the Enforcement Authority of asset recovery in Mauritius.

Legal career
Following his tertiary education in England Ajit Boolell returned to Mauritius where he worked at his father Satcam Boolell's legal practice before joining the Civil Service. After joining the Civil Service in September 1986 he held the position of Parliamentary Counsel from 2003 to 2009. In 2010 he was made Senior Counsel. In February 2009 Ajit Boolell was appointed Director of Public Prosecutions (DPP) as the retirement of his predecessor Gérard Angoh.

Early life and education
Ajit Boolell completed his secondary education at Royal College Port Louis before studying Economics at the University of Essex. After completing a Conversion Degree he passed the bar exam and was called to the Bar in England and Wales in 1985. He obtained a Master of Laws (LLM) degree from King’s College London.

References

Directors of Public Prosecutions (Mauritius)
Mauritian Hindus
Mauritian people of Indian descent
20th-century Mauritian lawyers
Year of birth missing (living people)
Living people
21st-century Mauritian lawyers